Alejandro Peirano López (born 11 March 1993) is a Chilean middle-distance runner competing primarily in the 800 metres. He won a bronze medal at the 2018 Ibero-American Championships.

International competitions

1Did not finish in the final

Personal bests
Outdoor
400 metres – 47.70 (Santiago 2018)
800 metres – 1:48.62 (Trujillo 2018)

References

External links 
 Alejandro Frenc PEIRANO LÓPEZ at the 2019 Pan American Games

1993 births
Living people
Chilean male middle-distance runners
Athletes (track and field) at the 2010 Summer Youth Olympics
Athletes (track and field) at the 2019 Pan American Games
Pan American Games competitors for Chile
Competitors at the 2013 Summer Universiade
Ibero-American Championships in Athletics winners